O'Melveny & Myers LLP is an American multinational law firm founded in Los Angeles, California in 1885. The firm employs approximately 740 lawyers and has offices in California, Washington, D.C., New York City, Beijing, Brussels, Hong Kong, London, Seoul, Shanghai, Singapore, and Tokyo.

History
The firm was founded in 1885 as "Graves & O'Melveny" by Henry O'Melveny and Jackson Graves.  The firm gained traction through its work on land litigation surrounding the ownership of California's Spanish haciendas and its handling of the legalities of hydroelectric power, which helped to transform the arid basin of Los Angeles into a car-centric metropolis. The firm became "O'Melveny & Myers" when Chief Justice of California Louis Wescott Myers joined the firm after retiring from the Supreme Court of California in 1926.

In 1977, O'Melveny hired William T. Coleman, Jr., who had helped the country move toward desegregation 23 years prior as a lead strategist for the plaintiffs in the landmark Brown v. Board of Education.

The former Chair of the firm, Arthur B. Culvahouse, Jr., who serves at the firm's Washington, D.C. office, was White House Counsel during the Reagan Administration.  Former U.S. Secretary of State Warren Christopher (1925-2011), who served as the firm's chairman from 1981 to 1991, was a senior partner at the firm's Century City, CA office. Warren Christopher supervised the largest period of growth in the firm's history, expanding to seven countries. Litigation partner Bradley J. Butwin became chair of the firm in 2012; his term extends until 2025.

The firm defended Donald Trump against a lawsuit over Trump University. O'Melveny vetted the president's nominees. The firm represented the Trump inaugural committee when it was investigated by the U.S. Attorney's Office for the Southern District of New York. O'Melveny also represented President Trump's commerce secretary, Wilbur Ross, over allegations of conflicted investments.

Reputation 
The firm ranked number one on Vault.com's 2019 list of "Best Firms to Work For," a ranking of the world's law firms based on quality of life for attorneys. It received the highest rankings for "Job Satisfaction", "Associate/Partner Relations", "Best Firm Culture", "Quality of work", "Transparency", "Hours Requirements", "Summer Associate Program", and "Attorney Development." The firm ranked number six for "Best Attorney Compensation." According to Above the Law, first-year associates at the firm are paid a base salary of $215,000 with bonuses available yearly. Summer associates are paid the same salary, although it is prorated over 10 weeks (amounting to $3,700 per week). Vault ranked O'Melveny as the 4th most selective law firm in the world in 2019. However, a former attorney of the firm, and winner of the Wall Street Journal's "Law Blog's" Lawyer of the Year award in 2007, has criticized the firm's handling of discrimination and sexual abuse matters.

O'Melveny ranked in the Top 10 for the 5th consecutive year on the 2016 "A-List," a measure of the nation's most "well-rounded" firms. The firm has been a winner, finalist, or honorable mention recipient in every year of the biennial Litigation Department of the Year contest since its 2002 inception, one of only two firms to achieve that distinction.

It is one of the highest-paying law firms in the United States.

Notable partners and alumni 

Former partner Louis Caldera served as United States Secretary of the Army.
Warren Christopher (1925-2011), former U.S. Secretary of State under President Bill Clinton, was a senior partner at the firm's Century City, CA office until his death in 2011.
William Thaddeus Coleman, Jr. (1920-2017), was Secretary of Transportation under President Gerald Ford, and also helped Thurgood Marshall win Brown vs. Board of Education. Coleman was a senior partner and the Senior Counselor in the Washington, DC office.
Thomas E. Donilon served as National Security Advisor under President Barack Obama, and serves in the Washington, DC office. He is known for being featured in the famous photograph, "The Situation Room."
Arthur B. Culvahouse, Jr., former White House Counsel to President Ronald Reagan. He is the former Chair of the firm and works out of the Washington, DC office.
Former partner Walter Dellinger (1941-2022) was United States Solicitor General for the 1996-97 Term of the Supreme Court. 
Danielle C. Gray served as a senior advisor to President Barack Obama and is a partner in the New York office. While serving in the Obama Administration, Newsweek referred to her as "the most powerful White House staffer you've never heard of."
Former partner Sandra Segal Ikuta is a federal judge on the United States Court of Appeals for the Ninth Circuit.
Former associate Mike Gatto is California State Assemblyman and chairman of the Appropriations Committee.
Former associate Goodwin Liu is an Associate Justice of the Supreme Court of California.
Former partner Kim McLane Wardlaw is a federal judge on the United States Court of Appeals for the Ninth Circuit.
Former associate John B. Owens is a federal judge on the United States Court of Appeals for the Ninth Circuit.
Former associate Stephen Reinhardt was a federal judge on the United States Court of Appeals for the Ninth Circuit.
Former partner Michael Zimmerman is a former Chief Justice of the Utah Supreme Court.
Sri Srinivasan, now a federal judge on the United States Court of Appeals for the District of Columbia Circuit, was the former chair of the appellate practice.
Former partner Alejandro Mayorkas is the Deputy Secretary of Department of Homeland Security and the former director of U.S. Citizenship and Immigration Services.
Pamela Harris, now a federal judge on the United States Court of Appeals for the Fourth Circuit.
Richard Riordan, 39th Mayor of Los Angeles (1993-2001).

In culture
In an episode of The Sopranos, a DOJ prosecutor is heard saying, "He ruined his six-figure future at O'Melveny & Myers when he blew the Junior Soprano trial."

References

External links
 
 

Law firms established in 1885
Law firms based in Los Angeles
Foreign law firms with offices in Hong Kong
Foreign law firms with offices in Japan